Lygniodes ciliata is a moth of the family Erebidae first described by Frederic Moore in 1867. It is found in Thailand, Vietnam, India, Sri Lanka, Bangladesh, China, Sumatra and Taiwan.

Description
Its wingspan is about 84 mm. Male is greyish brown with brown underside. Hindwings are greyish white with brown striae, except on costal area. Female has much browner underside. Some specimens have a stigma in the shape of Old English "E" at end of cell of forewings.

References

External links
Species info

Moths described in 1867
Lygniodes